The Amali – also called Amals, Amalings or Amalungs – were a leading dynasty of the Goths, a Germanic people who confronted the Roman Empire during the decline of the Western Roman Empire. They eventually became the royal house of the Ostrogoths and founded the Ostrogothic Kingdom of Italy.

Origin 

The Amal clan was claimed to have descended from the divine. Jordanes writes:
Now the first of these heroes, as they themselves relate in their legends, was Gapt, who begat Hulmul. And Hulmul begat Augis; and Augis begat him who was called Amal, from whom the name of the Amali comes. Athal begat Achiulf and Oduulf. Now Achiulf begat Ansila and Ediulf, Vultuulf and Ermanaric.

This provides the following stemma for the earliest rulers of the Goths, before outlining in more detail the two divisions that arose from the son, Achiulf of Athal, the last in this early lineage :

 

Gapt or Gaut is the Scandinavian god of war. Hulmul or Humli-Hulmul, is considered the divine father of the Danish people.  Ermanaric (also referred to as Ermanaricus or Hermanaric), is identified as a Greuthungian king who ruled territories in modern Ukraine. Ermanaric signals the tenth generation, and the first generation to be backed by historical record.

History 

The Amali remained a prominent family as the Greuthungi evolved into the Ostrogoths, became vassals of the Huns and moved west. In 453, the Ostrogoths regained their independence under the Amali, Theodemir. According to Jordanes, "Vultuulf begat Valaravans and Valaravans begat Vinitharius. Vinitharius moreover begat Vandalarius; Vandalarius begat Theodemir and Valamir and Vidimer." Theodemir's son, Theoderic the Great, founded the Ostrogothic Kingdom.

A separate branch of the family were members of the Visigoths. Sigeric, a brief usurper to the Visigothic throne in 415, may have been a member of the Amali. Another Visigoth, Eutharic, reunited the branches of the family by marrying Theoderic's daughter Amalasuntha. Jordanes states "Hermanaric, the son of Achiulf, begat Hunimund, and Hunimund begat Thorismud. Now Thorismud begat Beremud, Beremud begat Veteric, and Veteric likewise begat Eutharic."

The last attested member of the Amali house was Theodegisclus, son of Theodahad.

In Literature 

In the Nibelungenlied and some other medieval German epic poems, the followers of Dietrich von Bern are referred to as 'Amelungen'. In other cases, Amelung is reinterpreted as the name of one of Dietrich's ancestors. The Kaiserchronik also refers to Dietrich/Theoderic's family as the 'Amelungen', and in a letter of bishop Meinhard von Bamberg, as well as the Annals of Quedlinburg, 'Amulungum'/'Amelung' ("the Amelung") is used to refer to Dietrich himself. This shows that the family's legacy was remembered in oral tradition far into the Middle Ages, long after any stories about Amal himself had ceased to circulate.

Cassiodorus' Origo Gothica describes the Goths moving to the Black Sea, where they split into two factions, the Amali, who would later become the Ostrogoths, and the Balthi, who become the Visigoths. Both the Amali and the Balthi are recalled as families of "kings and heroes." However, even before Cassiodorus' time, the tradition of the Amal appeared to be still popular. This is shown in the naming of the royals, like Theodoric's daughters, Ostrogotho and Amalasuintha, and his sister, Amalafrida, who were all given Amal names.

Legacy 

At least two prominent noble families claimed descent from Amali: the Billungs, Dukes of Saxony, also known as the Amelungs or von Ömlingen, and the Solovjovs, Barons of the Russian Empire from 1727 (in German sources, known as the von Solowhoff or Solowhoff von Greutungen). The Solovjovs specifically claimed Ermanaric as their ancestor.

The name of the 6th-century Visigothic king Amalaric - meaning "Amal ruler," though he actually belonged to the Balt dynasty - was the source of the continental toponyms of North and South America, via the Italian variant "Amerigo."

In popular culture
 The Amali appear as the "Amaling" dynasty in the grand strategy game Crusader Kings 2.

See also
 Attilid dynasty
 Balt dynasty

Amali Rulers 
Ermanaric, king of the Greuthungi, ca 370
Sigeric, king of the Visigoths, 415
Theodemir, king of the Ostrogoths, until 474
Theoderic the Great, king of the Ostrogoths, 474–526
Athalaric, king of the Ostrogoths, 526–534
Theodahad, king of the Ostrogoths, 534–536

Genealogy

See also 
 The Origin and Deeds of the Goths (Getica)
 Vadamerca

References

Sources 

 Jones, Arnold. Prosopography of the Later Roman Empire, Cambridge at the University Press, 1971.
 

Amali dynasty
European dynasties
Gothic families
Ostrogoths